A Volcanic eruption took place in 1222 at a volcanic field in Northern Syria near Killis (also Kilis), Turkey. The volcano probably formed because of a regional Graben. The Volcano is Andesitic-Basaltic in composition.

Eruptions

1222 Eruption
The eruption was a VEI 0 that produced lava flows sometime in 1222 AD.

Other fields
Fields that are of Miocene-Quaternary in age are located in nearby Turkey.

References
 Global Volcanism Program
 Volcanolive.com
 Volcanodiscovery.com

External links
 Photo of 1222 AD Lava Flow on Blogger

Volcanoes of Syria
Active volcanoes